Fort Clifton Archeological Site is a historic American Civil War fort archaeological site located at Fort Clifton Park, Colonial Heights, Virginia. The park is the site of Fort Clifton on the Appomattox River where five Union ships sailed on Confederate troops on June 11, 1864.  The Confederate Battery, with cannon emplacements, remained in Confederate hands as the cannons drove the Union attackers away. The park has earthworks that criss-cross the property.  Fort Clifton Park has hiking trails and Civil War campaign signage on site.

It was listed on the National Register of Historic Places in 1981.

External links
 Plan of Batteries Charles H. Dimmock, Captain, Engineers

References

Clifton
Archaeological sites on the National Register of Historic Places in Virginia
Government buildings completed in 1864
Buildings and structures in Colonial Heights, Virginia
National Register of Historic Places in Colonial Heights, Virginia
Clifton
American Civil War on the National Register of Historic Places
1864 establishments in Virginia